Manu'ula Asovalu Tuiasosopo (born August 30, 1957) is a former American football defensive tackle. He was the 18th overall selection of the 1979 NFL Draft by the Seattle Seahawks of the National Football League (NFL). He played college football at UCLA. After five years in Seattle, he played the final three seasons of his career with the San Francisco 49ers, who won Super Bowl XIX in January 1985.

Post-football
Tuiasosopo was last employed by the Alaska Airlines cargo department in Seattle. He currently coaches the defensive line for Monroe High School in Monroe, Washington.

Personal life
Tuiasosopo is the father of former NFL quarterback, Marques, and running back, Zach.  His son Matt was a utility player in Major League Baseball and is now manager of the Rome Braves in the minors.  He also has two daughters, Leslie and Ashley.

References

1957 births
Living people
American football defensive ends
American football defensive tackles
San Francisco 49ers players
Seattle Seahawks players
UCLA Bruins football players
High school football coaches in Washington (state)
Players of American football from Los Angeles
Players of American football from Long Beach, California
American sportspeople of Samoan descent
Sports coaches from Los Angeles
Sportspeople from Long Beach, California